Commodity is the fifth studio album from American Christian rock band Remedy Drive. The project was funded via a Kickstarter funding campaign that enabled the band to self-release the album on September 23, 2014. Remedy Drive worked with former band member Philip Zach on production. The album cover is a photograph taken by NASA after debris created a small hole in their Solar Max Satellite in 1984. The image was made public in 2006.

Reception

Signaling in a four star review by CCM Magazine, Andy Argyrakis mentions, "Not only does Remedy Drive make its strongest musical statement since its 1998 beginnings, but the lyrical thread that runs throughout Commodity is also the group's most vital." Bobby Gilles, in a four star review from Worship Leader, explaining, "Now, with the concept album Commodity, Remedy Drive is providing a soundtrack to the resistance, declaring 'the Kingdom of God is at hand.'" In agreement with the four star ratings is Sarah Dos Santos of HM Magazine, recognizing, "There are a number of innovative songwriting skills used on this album, which helps to put the band’s unique synth-rock ambiance in a league of its own instead of as a Coldplay clone." Hamilton Barber, writes a four star review for Jesus Freak Hideout, declaring, "Commodity is a good record." Specifying in a four and a half star review at New Release Tuesday, Mary Nikkel observes, "Commodity is a concept album, and should be heard as such." Jessica Morris, awarding the album a nine and a half star rating for Jesus Wired, writes, "this album is breathtaking."

Tracks

Charts

References

2014 albums
Remedy Drive albums
Kickstarter-funded albums